Neel Kamal is a 1968 Indian Hindi-language romantic thriller directed by Ram Maheshwari, starring Waheeda Rehman as the eponymous lead, Raaj Kumar, Manoj Kumar, Mehmood, Balraj Sahni, Lalita Pawar and Shashikala.

Neel Kamal received highly positive reviews from critics upon release and proved to be a major commercial success at the box-office, becoming the third highest-grossing film of 1968.

At the 16th Filmfare Awards, Neel Kamal received 8 nominations including Best Film, Best Director (Maheshwari). Best Supporting Actor (Raaj Kumar), Best Supporting Actress (Shashikala) and Best Comedian (Mehmood), and won Best Actress for Rehman, her second win in the category after Guide (1965).

Plot
 
Sita  and her friends go on a college trip. Sita sleepwalks and when she is about to be hit by a train on the railway track, Ram saves her. Impressed, her father decides to get her married to him. 

After marriage, Sita discovers that her sleepwalking is not the usual kind, as it takes her to the story of her past life. 

Chitrasen, an artisan, was in love with the princess Neel Kamal (Sita in her past life). The king  rejects his alliance for his daughter and as a punishment, buries him alive. Chitrasen's love for Neel Kamal remained immortal and his soul survives for centuries in hopes to meet her and be with her. One night, while sleep walking, Sita is invited to Chitrasen's burial by a song. Her mother-in-law, a very cross person, believes that Sita is having an affair and gives her a tough time at home along with her sister-in-law Chanchal. Her only supporter in the house is Giridhar,  Chanchal's husband, who is a ghar jamai and saves her from committing suicide with the help of a Pujari (David). 
Sita's father also comes in search of his daughter at Ram's house to whom he clarified her sickness of sleepwalking several times earlier. Now the family prepares for a second marriage of Ram after Girdhar informs them that Sita is dead, but Giridhar secretly informs Ram that Sita is alive and now pregnant. One night while traveling by train, she stops the train by pulling the chain at the same Chitrapur station. Sita reaches Chitrasen's place and they have a brief past conversation with his immortal soul. Finally, Chitrasen's soul becomes free and Sita falling unconscious. Ram rescues her and they live happily ever after.

Cast
Waheeda Rehman as Rajkumari Neel Kamal / Sita
Manoj Kumar as Ram
Raaj Kumar as Chitrasen
Lalita Pawar as Thakurain
Mehmood as Girdhar Gopal Agarwal
Shashikala as Chanchal
Balraj Sahni as Mr. Raichand
Ramayan Tiwari
P. Jairaj
David Abraham as Guruji 
Murad as Emperor
Chhaya
Nasreen
Nandini
Gopal Sehgal
Jagdish Raj
Ruby Mayer as Dean of the girls' college 
Mumtaz Begum 
Sheela R.
Sophia
Shenaaz
Apsara
Abhimanyu Sharma
Rajan Kapoor	
Nazir Kashmiri
V.P. Verma	
Dev Chand
Shribhagwan
Bhushan Tiwari
Vijay Maria

Soundtrack

The soundtrack of Neel Kamal were composed by Ravi Shankar Sharma and lyrics were provided by Sahir Ludhianvi. The soundtrack is widely notable for the song, "Baabul Ki Duaayein Leti Jaa" sung by Mohammed Rafi, which became popular as a Hindi wedding song during the actual bidaai ritual (the departure of the bride from her parental house).

Awards and nominations
16th Filmfare Awards:
Won

 Best Actress – Waheeda Rehman

Nominated

 Best Film – Pannalal Maheshwari
 Best Director – Ram Maheshwari
 Best Supporting Actor – Raaj Kumar
 Best Supporting Actress – Shashikala
 Best Comedian – Mehmood
 Best Male Playback Singer – Mohammad Rafi for "Baabul Ki Duaayein Leti Jaa"
 Best Story – Gulshan Nanda

References

External links
 

1968 films
1960s Hindi-language films
Films about reincarnation
Films scored by Ravi
Indian ghost films
Indian romantic thriller films
Films about sleep disorders